Marie Adelaide may refer to:

 Marie-Adélaïde, Grand Duchess of Luxembourg (1894–1924), reigned 1912–1919
 Princess Marie Adélaïde of Savoy (1685–1712), Duchess of Burgundy and Dauphine of France
 Princess Marie Adélaïde of France (1732–1800), daughter of King Louis XV
 Louise Marie Adélaïde de Bourbon (1753–1821), Duchess of Orléans, and mother of King Louis Phillipe I
 Princess Marie Adelaide of Luxembourg (1924–2007)
 Princess Adélaïde of Orléans (1777–1847), one of the twin daughters of King Louis Philippe